The  Inuvialuit (sing. Inuvialuk; the real people) or Western Canadian Inuit are Inuit who live in the western Canadian Arctic region. They, like all other Inuit, are descendants of the Thule who migrated eastward from Alaska. Their homeland – the Inuvialuit Settlement Region – covers the Arctic Ocean coastline area from the Alaskan border, east through the Beaufort Sea and beyond the Amundsen Gulf which includes some of the western Canadian Arctic Islands, as well as the inland community of Aklavik and part of Yukon. The land was demarked in 1984 by the Inuvialuit Final Agreement.

History and migration

 

The Inuvialuit Settlement Region was primarily inhabited by Siglit Inuit until their numbers were decimated by the introduction of new diseases in the second half of the 19th century. Nunatamiut, Alaskan Inuit, moved into traditional Siglit areas in the 1910s and 20s, enticed in part by renewed demand for furs from the Hudson's Bay Company and European markets. The Nunatamiut who settled in the Siglit area became known as Uummarmiut. Originally, there was an intense dislike between the Siglit and the Uummarmiut, but these differences faded over the years, and the two aboriginal peoples intermarried. With improved healthcare and Nunatamiut intermarriage, the Inuvialuit now number approximately 3,100.

In the 1930s, the Inuvialuit were involved in a Canadian government scheme to introduce reindeer herding as the primary economic driver of the Western Arctic. At tremendous expense, thousands of domesticated animals were herded from Alaska to the new Mackenzie Delta community of Reindeer Station. Indigenous Sámi people were imported from Norway to teach Inuvialuit men how to care for their own individual herds. However, the program was relatively unsuccessful, as it required a lonely lifestyle and was less lucrative than traditional hunting and trapping.

The Inuvialuit Settlement Region Traditional Knowledge Report of 2006 identified additional naming characteristics. Those Inuvialuit who live in the west are called Ualinirmiut (Ualiniq) by the people of the east. The Inuvialuit who occupy the east are known as Kivaninmiut (Kivaliniq) by the people of the west.

The Inuit of Ulukhaktok are neither Siglit nor Uummarmiut but are Copper Inuit and refer to themselves as Ulukhaktokmuit after Ulukhaktok, the native name for what used to be called Holman.

The proposed Mackenzie Valley Pipeline would have passed through both Inuvialuit and Gwich'in territory before the abandonment of the project in 2017.

Language
The traditional language is known as Inuvialuktun and it is made up of three or four dialects. Uummarmiutun, spoken by the Uummarmiut of Aklavik and Inuvik, is an Inupiatun dialect but is usually associated with Inuvialuktun. Siglitun is spoken by the Siglit of Sachs Harbour, Paulatuk, Tuktoyaktuk and Inuvik. Kangiryuarmiutun is used by the Kangiryuarmiut of Ulukhaktok. Kangiryuarmiutun is essentially the same as Inuinnaqtun which is also used in the Nunavut communities of Kugluktuk, Bathurst Inlet and Cambridge Bay. Natsilingmiutut used by the Netsilingmiut of Gjoa Haven, Taloyoak, Kugaaruk and Repulse Bay in Nunavut. Uummarmiutun, Siglitun and Inuinnaqtun (Kangiryuarmiutun) are all written using Latin script while Natsilingmiutut is written in Inuktitut syllabics.

Culture
Year-round, Inuvialuit hunt caribou from the Cape Bathurst and Bluenose herds, and have also shared the Porcupine herd with the Gwich’in. There has been some tension between the Inuvialuit and the Gwich’in over caribou hunting. Other activities are seasonal:
 Spring: fishing, geese hunting, grizzly hunting
 Summer: whaling, fishing, gathering berries, roots and medicinal plants
 Autumn: fishing, sealing, geese hunting, and plant gathering
 Winter: fishing, sealing, polar bear hunting

Traditional games include:
 akimuq: high kick game
 ayahaaq: string game
 iglukisaaq: juggling rocks
 mak: played by trying to make a person laugh
 napataak: darts; played with a wooden handle and sharp nail

Communities

Aklavik (Aklavik Indian Band, Ehdiitat Gwich’in Council) and Inuvik (Nihtat Gwich’in Council) are shared with the Gwich’in people, who are represented by the Gwich’in Tribal Council.

References

External links

 The Inuvialuit
 Inuvialuit Development Corporation
 

 
Copper Inuit